Supercross Circuit is a video game developed by Idol Minds and published by 989 Sports for the PlayStation in 1999.

Reception

The game received above-average reviews according to the review aggregation website GameRankings. Doug Trueman of NextGen said, "There's more than enough in this title to engross even the most cynical racing fan until the first 128-bit motocross game is released."

Notes

References

External links
 

1999 video games
Deck Nine games
Motorcycle video games
North America-exclusive video games
PlayStation (console) games
PlayStation (console)-only games
Racing video games
Video games developed in the United States